Pachía District is one of ten districts of the province Tacna in Peru.

See also 
 Qutañani

References